

Formula 

The 1969-70 French Rugby Union Championship was contested by 64 teams divided in 8 pools..The first four of each pool, were qualified for the "last 32".

The club of La Voulte Sportif (now merged into ROC La Voulte-Valence) won the competition beating Montferrand (now known as ASM Clermont Auvergne) in the final. La Voulte won le Bouclier de Brennus at his first final, while 'Montferrand lost their fourth final of four.

Qualification round 
In bold the clubs qualified for the next round. The teams are listed according to the final ranking

"Last 32" 
In bold the clubs qualified for the next round

"Last 16" 
In bold the clubs qualified for the next round

Quarter of finals 
In bold the clubs qualified for the next round

Semifinals

Final

External links 
 Compte rendu finale de 1970 lnr.fr
 Finale 1970 finalesrugby.com

1970
France
Championship